Mary Disston School is a historic school building located in the Tacony neighborhood of Philadelphia, Pennsylvania.  It was built in 1900–1901, and is a two-story, three-bay, "U"-shaped stone building in the Colonial Revival style. A rear addition was built in 1967.  It features a recessed central entrance with columnaded porch, arched openings, and a balcony; a central Palladian window; and hipped roof.

It was added to the National Register of Historic Places in 1988. For a time the building was home to St. Josaphat's Ukrainian Catholic Church.

References

School buildings on the National Register of Historic Places in Philadelphia
Colonial Revival architecture in Pennsylvania
School buildings completed in 1901
Northeast Philadelphia
Defunct schools in Pennsylvania
Former churches in Pennsylvania
1901 establishments in Pennsylvania